The PL-17 or PL-20 is an active radar-guided beyond-visual-range air-to-air missile developed by the People's Republic of China for the People's Liberation Army Air Force (PLAAF).

History and development
The missile was tested on a Shenyang J-16 fighter in 2016, and can also be deployed on Chinese imported Su-30MKK and Su-35 fighters. It's understood that PL-17 is a separate development from the ramjet-powered PL-21 (PL-XX). In October 2022, Chinese state media reported that PL-17 was incorporated into the PLAAF service.

Design
The extended length makes the missile unfit for the internal weapons bay of the Chengdu J-20. During the flight, PL-17 would rely on inertial guidance, satellite navigation, and data-link to track targets. During the terminal phase, the missile would turn on its multimode seeker with both active AESA radar and IR-homing to track the target autonomously. The missile features a low-drag profile, and maneuverability is provided by four small control fins and thrust-vectoring engines.

See also
 PL-15
 PL-21
 Aster 30
 R-37M

References

Air-to-air missiles of the People's Republic of China
Weapons of the People's Republic of China